Elamanchili is a town or city (Connecting Paddy Fields City [Future]) in Anakapalli district of the Indian state of Andhra Pradesh. It is a municipality and also the mandal headquarters of Elamanchili mandal. This town has historical importance dating back to 7th Century AD.

History 
Elamanchilii was once called as ella - majili, which is the border village of Kalinga and Andhra empires. This place was used for the collection of taxes as it is on the border of these areas. Kalla Varahala Naidu (Vara Naidu) The King Of Elamanchili.

Many Historical and archaeological evidences were found in the surroundings of Elamanchili dating back the history of this town to the times of Early Buddhism in India, Jainism and Medieval Hinduism. The Kotturu Dhanadibbalu Buddhist and Dharapalem Hindu sites respectively are near this town. This particular area of Elamanchili was once under the rule of Andhra-Sathavahanas.
Some Pre-historic findings were excavated from the surroundings of Panchadharla, Dharapalem and Elamanchili surrounding Hills of Eastern Ghats. Research work is under progress on these excavations, and recently found lord venkateswara swamy statue.

The village of Sarvasiddhi (10 km from Elamanchili) was constructed by Eastern Chalukyas King Kubja Vishnuvardhan during 615 CE. Vishnuvardhana ruled over a kingdom extending from Nellore to Visakhapatnam. He assumed the title of Vishamasiddhi (conqueror of difficulties). Vishnuvardhana participated in the wars between his brother Putekesin II and the Pallava Narasimhavarma I and probably lost his life in battle in 641 CE. This area was under the Eastern Chalukyas. Elamanchili was under the rule of Eastern Chalukyas as some edicts were found by the name of Vijayaditya VII (1063 – 1068 C.E., 1072 – 1075 C.E.) at Elamanchili.

The famous Dharmalingeswara Temple at Panchadharla was believed to be constructed along with the famous

Demographics

Transport

Elamanchili is well connected by rail and road. Elamanchili railway station provide halt for many express trains. Buses are available from all parts of area in the state.
Nearest airport is Visakhapatnam International Airport which is about 54 km from the town.

Legislative Assembly 
1951-1954 - N/A 
1955-1962 - Venkata Surya Narayana Raju Chintlapat
1962-1967 - Veesam Sanyasi Naidu
1966-1972 - Satyanarayana Nagireddi
1972-1978 - Kumara Venkata Satya Narayana Raju Kakarlapudi (K K Raju)
1978-1983 - Veesam Sanyasi Naidu
1983-1985 - Kumara Venkata Satya Narayana Raju Kakarlapudi (K K Raju)
1985-2004 - Chalapathi Rao Pappala
2004-2014 - U V R Raju (Kanna Babu)
2014–2019- Panchakarla Ramesh Babu
2019-present- U V R Raju (Kanna Babu)

Education
The primary and secondary school education is imparted by government, aided and private schools, under the School Education Department of the state.

See also 
List of municipalities in Andhra Pradesh

References 

Cities and towns in Anakapalli district